Paulí Pallàs (1862–October 6, 1893) was a Spanish anarchist and typesetter who carried out an unsuccessful assassination attempt on Catalan captain general Arsenio Martínez Campos.

Life 

Paulino Pallás was born in 1862 in Spain. He moved to Argentina, where he became an anarchist communist. He became involved with the Brazilian revolutionary movement in 1891 and in May 1892, he threw a bomb into the Rio de Janeiro Alcantara Theater. He returned to Spain in October.

Martínez Campos bombing 

In 1893, he unsuccessfully attempted to assassinate Catalonia Captain General Arsenio Martínez Campos, which ended in Pallás's execution. Martínez Campos had been responsible for violently repressing the January 1892 Jerez uprising and execution of four Jerez anarchists. In revenge, on September 24, 1893, Pallás threw two bombs at Martínez Campos, but missed and killed at least two bystanders. Martínez Campos suffered minor injuries. Pallàs did not seek to escape. After being tried by a court martial, Pallás was executed by firing squad on October 6, 1893. His final words were, "The vengeance will be terrible." A month later, his friend would avenge Pallás's death with the Liceu bombing, killing over a dozen.

References

Bibliography

Further reading 

 
 

1862 births
1893 deaths
Spanish anarchists
Typesetters
Anarcho-communists
Anarchist assassins

Executed anarchists